The Criminal Investigation and Detection Group (CIDG) is the primary investigation arm of the Philippine National Police.

History
The Criminal Investigation and Detection Group was established as the Criminal Information Service whose origin traces back as early as 1901 shortly after the establishment of the Philippine Constabulary when the Information Section was established as mandated by the Section 2, Article 255 of the Philippine Commission. In 1920 the Information Division was integrated with the United States Army Forces in the Far East and its detectives participated at the Battle of Bataan, many of which also were forced to participate at the Bataan Death March

After World War II, the Military Police Command was activated in lieu of the Philippine Constabulary. A Criminal Investigation Branch of the G2 to investigate crimes and maintain peace and order. This division remain operational after the independence of the Philippines from the United States on July 4, 1946.

In 1953, the Philippine Constabulary was integrated to the Armed Forces of the Philippines and a Police Affairs Division was created. A Criminal Laboratory was made by the division to support constabulary units with background in scientific criminology. On January 19, 1953, the General Headquarters of the Armed Forces issued General Order Nr. 14 which resulted to the reorganization of the defunct Philippine Constabulary into two main components, a general staff unit, called the Intelligence Division or C2, and an operating special staff unit, the Criminal Investigation Service (CIS)

On October 28, 1955, a Police Intelligence Branch was created by the CIS and in 1958 the investigation body was elevated to a division. The CIS, adopted Criminal Investigation Office as its new name on October 5, 1960 but reverted to its old name two months later. Criminal Investigation Office on October 5, 1960. It was again renamed to Criminal Investigation Service Command (CISC) in 1989 and to its present name in 1999.

References

External links
 Official Site

Philippine National Police
1953 establishments in the Philippines